Rozstanie (English title: Goodbye to the Past) is a Polish psychological melodrama film released in 1961, directed by Wojciech Jerzy Has.

Cast
Lidia Wysocka – Magdalena
Władysław Kowalski − Olek Nowak
Gustaw Holoubek − Oskar Rennert
Irena Netto − Wiktoria Budkowa, the housemaid
Adam Pawlikowski − Żbik, countess' son
Danuta Krawczyńska – Iwona
Maria Gella – countess
Bogumił Kobiela − waiter
Zbigniew Cybulski – famous actor (cameo appearance)

External links

1961 films
1960s Polish-language films
Polish black-and-white films
Films directed by Wojciech Has
1961 drama films
Polish drama films